The U.S. Army Medical Center of Excellence (MEDCoE) is located at Fort Sam Houston, Joint Base San Antonio, Texas. MEDCoE comprises the 32d Medical Brigade, the U.S. Army Medical Professional Training Brigade (MPTB), and the AMEDD Noncommissioned Officers Academy (NCOA).  It serves the U.S. Army in educating and training all of its medical personnel.  The Center formulates the Army Medical Department's (AMEDD's) organization, tactics, doctrine, equipment, and academic training support. In 2015, the mission for the Academy of Health Sciences (AHS) moved from the School to the Center, and was renamed the Department of Training and Academic Affairs (DoTAA) as result of a reorganization.

Although its institutional lineage dates back to 1920, the present "C&S" were established by permanent order of the Surgeon General in 1991.

History
On 1 September 1920, the Medical Department Field Service School was established at Carlisle Barracks, Pennsylvania at the request of the Surgeon General, Major General Merritte W. Ireland. In December that same year, the Army renamed it the Medical Field Service School (MFSS).

After 25 1/2 years of operation, the school was deactivated on 15 February 1946 and its mission transferred to multiple schools located at Fort Sam Houston, Texas. The school underwent various name changes and restructuring over the years; incorporating the diverse medical functional areas of the Army Medical Department (AMEDD) along the way. One significant change was on 10 December 1972, when the Secretary of the Army, Robert F. Froehlke re-designated the school to the Academy of Health Sciences.

On 15 July 1991, the Surgeon General, Lieutenant General Frank F. Ledford Jr., established the AMEDDC&S by permanent order 103-1. The Academy of Health Sciences (AHS) now comprises the "school" portion of the AMEDDC&S.

In 1993, AMEDD Center and School was realigned under the U.S. Army Medical Command (Provisional) and remained under the U.S. Army Medical Command (MEDCOM) as it became fully functional in 1994.

As a result of 2005 BRAC legislation that required the bulk of enlisted technical medical training in the Army, Air Force, and Navy to be collocated to Fort Sam Houston, Texas, much of the enlisted medical training was moved from AHS to the Medical Education and Training Campus (METC). The transition took place during 2010 and 2011. In 2015, it was designated as the US Army Health Readiness Center of Excellence (HRCoE).

In 2008, the Clinical Investigation Regulatory Office (CIRO) began realignment under the U.S. Army Medical Research and Materiel Command (USAMRMC).

In 2015, AMEDDC&S reorganized to become AMEDDC&S HRCoE. Also during this time period, the Defense Programs Defense Medical Readiness Training Institute (DMRTI) was realigned under the Defense Health Agency (DHA).

On 19 October 2018, AMEDDC&S HRCoE began realignment from the U.S. Army Medical Command (USAMEDCOM) to U.S. Army Training and Doctrine Command (TRADOC) with operational control by the U.S. Army Combined Arms Center, to be completed effective 2 October 2019.

Effective 15 September 2019, the CoE was finally redesignated as the U.S. Army Medical Center of Excellence (MEDCoE) to further solidify their abiding dedication to Army Medicine, reverence to their profound history, and their commitment towards Army modernization with the singular focus of training Soldiers who will win our nations wars and then come home safely.

Structure

Center components

 Office of the Commanding General
 Personal Staff
 Chief of Staff (CoS)
 Coordinating Staff, including the International Military Student Office
 Special Staff
The Department of Training and Academic Affairs (DoTAA) :
 Office of the Dean
 Administrative Support Office
 Center of Distributed Learning (CdL)
 Training Program Management Division
 AMEDD Personnel Proponent Directorate
 Capability Development Integration Directorate
 The Army Medical Department Museum

School components
 32nd Medical Brigade
The U.S. Army Medical Professional Training Brigade (MPTB):

 Department of Behavioral Health Sciences
 Curriculum Development Division
 Department of Clinical Support Services
 Department of Combat Medic Training
 Department of Dental Science
 Department of Health Education and Training
 Department of Health Services Administration
 Department of Medical Science
 Department of Preventive Health Science
 Department of Veterinary Science
 Graduate School
 Leader Training Center (LTC)
 AMEDD Noncommissioned Officers Academy (NCOA)
 Navy Medicine Training Center

See also
Fort Sam Houston, Texas (FSH-TX)
Military Health System (MHS)
Uniformed Services University of the Health Sciences (USUHS)
Medical Education and Training Campus (METC)
U.S. Army Medical Command (MEDCOM)
U.S. Army Medical Department (AMEDD)

References

External links 
 
 U.S. Army Medical Department Center and School (AMEDDC&S) Official Website
 AMEDD's Academy of Health Sciences (AHS) Official Website
 U.S. Army School of Aviation Medicine (USASAM) Official Website
 AMEDDC&S milBook Community

Military medical organizations of the United States
Military academies of the United States
Military education and training in the United States
Educational institutions accredited by the Council on Occupational Education
Medical and health organizations based in Texas
Joint Base San Antonio